Laragh may refer to:

Northern Ireland
 Laragh, County Tyrone, a townland in County Tyrone
 Laragh (Kinawley), a townland in County Fermanagh
 Laragh (Rossory), a townland in County Fermanagh
 Laragh (Trory), a townland in County Fermanagh

Republic of Ireland
 Laragh, County Cavan
 Laragh, County Monaghan
 Laragh, County Wicklow
 Laragh, Kilcumreragh, a townland in the barony of Moycashel, County Westmeath
 Laragh, Kilmacnevan, a townland in the barony of Moygoish, County Westmeath